Rodni Vrh is a settlement in the Haloze area of eastern Slovenia. It lies in the Municipality of Podlehnik. The area traditionally belonged to the Styria region. It is now included in the Drava Statistical Region.

The local church, built on a hill in the northern part of the settlement, is dedicated to the Holy Spirit and belongs to the Parish of Sveta Trojica–Podlehnik. The Gothic sanctuary dates to the second half of the 15th century and the rest of the building dates to 1662.

References

External links
Rodni Vrh on Geopedia

Populated places in the Municipality of Podlehnik